Eupithecia rajata is a moth in the family Geometridae. It is found from the southern Himalaya (including Nepal, Pakistan and India) to south-western China (Yunnan), Myanmar and Thailand.

References

Moths described in 1858
rajata
Moths of Asia